Yingge is a railway station in Yingge District, New Taipei, Taiwan served by Taiwan Railways.

Overview

The station has two island platforms and the main station building is located over the tracks.

The station is expected to be a transfer station with the New Taipei Metro's Sanying line in 2023. This will also be the only station on Sanying line that can transfer to Taiwan Railways.

History
25 August 1901: The station opens for service.
24 January 2003: The new station building located over the tracks opens for service.
1 August 2008: The use of EasyCard starts at this station.
December 2023: Sanying line expected to open for service.

Around the station
Night Markets and Old Streets
 Yingge Nanyang Night Market (600m to the west)
 Yingge Historic Ceramics Street (700m to the southwest)
 Yingge Old Street (1km to the southwest)
 Ying Ge Guanguang Night Market (1.8km to the west)
 Sanxia Old Street (3.5km to the southeast)
Museums
 New Taipei City Yingge Ceramics Museum (700m to the southwest)
 New Taipei City Hakka Museum (2.2km to the southeast)
 Sanxia History Museum (3.4km to the southeast)
Parks and Rivers
 Dahan River
 Sanying Art Village (750m to the southeast)
 Sanying Ceramics Riverside Park (1.2km to the southeast)
 Sanying Bicycle Rental (650m to the southeast)
Universities
 National Taipei University (2.8km to the southeast)
 National Defense University (7.1km to the southwest)
Historical Sites
 Old Yingge Station
Government Offices
 Yingge District Office (200m to the northwest)

See also
 List of railway stations in Taiwan

References

External links 

TRA Yingge Station 

1901 establishments in Taiwan
Railway stations in New Taipei
Railway stations opened in 1901
Railway stations served by Taiwan Railways Administration